Georgi Valeryevich Kyrnats (born 22 June 1998) is a Russian football player.

Club career
Kyrnats was first included on CSKA's first team roster in February 2015 at the age of 16. He made appearances for the club's Under-19 squad in the 2015–16 UEFA Youth League and 2016–17 UEFA Youth League.

He made his professional debut in the 2018–19 UEFA Champions League group stage for PFC CSKA Moscow on 2 October 2018, 8 minutes into added time of their 1–0 victory over defending champions Real Madrid, after starting goalkeeper Igor Akinfeev was sent off for complaining. In the minute he spent on the pitch, he did not touch the ball once, and covered less distance than any player in the Champions League in the 2018-19 season, 39 meters.

On 22 August 2019, he signed with SKA-Khabarovsk.

References

External links
 

1998 births
Footballers from Moscow
Living people
Russian footballers
Russia youth international footballers
Association football goalkeepers
PFC CSKA Moscow players
FC SKA-Khabarovsk players
Russian Second League players